The second season of the American competitive reality television series Next Level Chef premiered on Fox on February 12, 2023, as the Super Bowl LVII lead-out program. Gordon Ramsay returns to host the season and serve as a mentor, along with returning mentors Nyesha Arrington and Richard Blais.

Production
On March 2, 2022, it was announced that the series was renewed for a second season, prior to the airing of the first season's finale on the same day. On May 16, 2022, it was announced that the season would premiere on February 12, 2023, before moving to its regular timeslot on February 16, 2023.

Chefs

Elimination table

†The contestant cooked the best dish overall and won safety for their team or themselves.

*The contestant cooked the best dish on their team and was selected by their mentor to win an immunity pin.

Episodes

Ratings

References

2023 American television seasons
Next Level Chef